Darkhan is a sum (district) of Khentii Province in eastern Mongolia. Bor-Öndör city is 43 km S from the sum center. In 2010, its population was 1,549.

References 

Districts of Khentii Province